Lo Que Son Las Cosas is the eleventh studio album by the Puerto Rican singer Ednita Nazario. The album was released in 1991, on Capitol, and EMI Latin.

The album was a commercial success, reaching number 5 on the Latin Pop Albums Chart. six singles were issued from Lo Que Son Las Cosas: "Después de Tanto", "Eres Libre", "Lo Que Son Las Cosas", "Más Que Un Amigo", "Ahora Es Tarde Ya", and "Por Tí Me Casaré". The song "Lo Que Son Las Cosas" would later be covered and made famous again by the Dominican singer Anaís. Her version of the song topped the Latin Charts for 6 weeks.

Track listing

Personnel
 Ednita Nazario – lead vocals
Additional musicians
 Dean Parks – guitars
 Michael Thompson – guitars
 Bobby Huff – drums, bass guitar
 John "J.R." Robinson – drums
 Neil Stubenhaus – bass guitar
 K. C. Porter – keyboards, piano, programming, backing vocals
 Aaron Zigman – keyboards, piano, programming 
 Rev. Dave Boruff – saxophone
 Luis Conte – percussion 
 Alex Brown – backing vocals
 Mortonette Jenkins – backing vocals

References

External links

Ednita Nazario albums
1991 albums
EMI Latin albums